Robert C. Pitts (June 23, 1919 – October 29, 2011) was an American basketball player who competed in the 1948 Summer Olympics.

Pitts played collegiately for the University of Arkansas, making All-Southwest Conference in 1942.  He later played for the Amateur Athletic Union juggernaut Phillips Petroleum Phillips 66ers, where he made AAU All-America in 1948.

Pitts was part of the American men's basketball team in the 1948 Summer Olympics, which won the gold medal.

Personal life
Pitts served as a first lieutenant in the 68th Bombardment Squadron of the United States Army Air Forces during World War II. Flying 22 missions with his crew, he was awarded the Air Medal.

References

External links
Robert Pitts' profile at databaseOlympics.com
Robert Pitts' obituary

1919 births
2011 deaths
American men's basketball players
Arkansas Razorbacks football players
Arkansas Razorbacks men's basketball players
Basketball players at the 1948 Summer Olympics
Basketball players from Mississippi
Medalists at the 1948 Summer Olympics
Olympic gold medalists for the United States in basketball
People from Pontotoc, Mississippi
Phillips 66ers players
United States men's national basketball team players
Guards (basketball)
United States Army Air Forces bomber pilots of World War II
United States Army Air Forces officers
Recipients of the Air Medal